Paul Thompson may refer to:

Education
Paul Thompson (professor) (born 1951), British management professor at the University of Strathclyde
Paul B. Thompson (philosopher) (born 1951), American philosopher at Michigan State University
Paul H. Thompson (born 20th century), American educator and administrator
Paul Thompson (rector) (born 1959), British rector of the Royal College of Art, London, England
Paul Thompson (neuroscientist) (born 1971), professor of neurology, University of Southern California

Literature
Paul Thompson (9/11 researcher), born 20th century, American writer; author of the non-fiction book The Terror Timeline
Paul Thompson (oral historian) (born 1935), British sociologist and oral historian
Paul B. Thompson (novelist) (born 1958), American fantasy writer
Paul Thompson (playwright) (born 1940), Canadian playwright and theatre director

Sports
Paul Thompson (American football) (born 1983), American quarterback for the University of Oklahoma Sooners
Paul Thompson (Australian footballer) (born 1958), Australian footballer for Melbourne
Paul Thompson (basketball) (born 1961), American former basketball player
Paul Thompson (footballer, born 1973) (born 1973), English former Hartlepool United player
Paul Thompson (ice hockey, born 1906) (1906–1991), Canadian ice hockey player and coach
Paul Thompson (ice hockey, born 1965) (born 1965), British ice hockey player and coach
Paul Thompson (ice hockey, born 1988), American ice hockey player
Paul Thompson (rower) (born 1964), Australian Olympic rowing coach for Australia and Great Britain

Other
Paul Thompson (1907–1984), British documentary film-maker, film historian and critic better known as Paul Rotha
Paul Thompson (broadcaster), Australian broadcaster
Paul Thompson (musician) (born 1951), English drummer for Roxy Music
Paul Thompson (sinologist) (1931–2007), British sinologist and pioneer in the field of Chinese computer applications
Paul Thompson, 1st Baron Wenlock (1784–1852), English nobleman and Whig politician
Paul W. Thompson (1906–1996), U.S. Army officer and Reader's Digest executive
 Paul Thompson (media executive), New Zealand media executive

See also
Porl Thompson (born 1957), English musician for The Cure; born Paul Stephen Thompson
Paul Thomson (disambiguation)